Kekulé may refer to:

August Kekulé (1829–1896), later August Kekule von Stradonitz, German organic chemist
Non-Kekulé molecule
Alexander Kekulé, a German medical microbiologist, virologist and academic
Kekulé Program a program for entering chemical structures into a database
Kekulé (crater), on the Moon
Reinhard Kekulé von Stradonitz (1839–1911), German archeologist, nephew of August 
Stephan Kekulé von Stradonitz (1863–1933), German genealogist, son of August